Clara Vădineanu (former Vînătoru; born 26 October 1986, in Moldova Nouă) is a Romanian handballer.

References 

1986 births
Living people
Romanian female handball players 
SCM Râmnicu Vâlcea (handball) players
People from Moldova Nouă